Susral is a Pakistani balck and white social film, directed by Riaz Shahid in his directorial debut, who also wrote the screenplay based on a story from his own novel "Hazar Dastaan". It has Yousuf Khan, Nighat Sultana, Allauddin, Laila and Agha Talish in the leading cast. Music was composed by Hassan Latif with lyrics by Tanvir Naqvi and Munir Niazi. It deals with common man problems such as physical disabilities and social injustice, thus ranks among the few realistic films of the Lollywood from 1960s. From the Golden Age of Pakistani cinema, the film which was a non-commercial film, what now is called as an art film, failed at the box office. The film marked the Mehdi Hassan's debut as a solo playback singer, as he performed the song "Jis ne mere dil ko dard diya".

On 9 March 2019, it was screened by ‘Mandawa Club’ of Lok Virsa Museum.

Cast 

 Yousuf Khan as Ahmad
 Laila as Zarina
 Allauddin as Majeed "Jeeda"
 Nighat Sultana as Safia
 Agha Talish as Safia's father
 Diljeet Mirza as Bhola
 Rukhsana
 Lehri as Marriage bureau owner
 Sultan Rahi (extra)

Soundtrack

References 

1960s Urdu-language films
Pakistani black-and-white films
Urdu-language Pakistani films